Maraq (also Romanized as Marq and Marraq; also known as Margh and Marrah) is a village of the Nur Ali Beyk Rural District; Central District of Saveh County, Markazi Province, Iran. According to the 2006 census, its population was 237 inhabitants, living in 80 families.

References 

Populated places in Saveh County